The Saint Petersburg Sports and Concert Complex was an arena in Saint Petersburg, Russia.

History

In Soviet time, it was called V. I. Lenin Sport & Concert Complex. The complex was completed in 1979 and opened in 1980.

Besides concerts, the arena was used for various sports, notably tennis, as it was the location of the St. Petersburg Open. Other sports events hosted at the SKK include bowling, tennis table, fencing. 

On January 31, 2020, the roof and a large portion of the walls collapsed during the process of dismantling, resulting in the death of one worker.

Significant events

See also
 List of tennis stadiums by capacity

References

External links

Building collapses in Russia
Demolished buildings and structures in Russia
Indoor arenas built in the Soviet Union
Indoor ice hockey venues in Russia
Moskovsky District, Saint Petersburg
Music venues completed in 1979
Music venues in Russia
Sports venues built in the Soviet Union
Sports venues completed in 1979
Sports venues demolished in 2020
Sports venues in Saint Petersburg
Tennis venues in Russia
Defunct sports venues in Russia
1980 establishments in Russia
2019 disestablishments in Russia
Demolished sports venues